Aenictes is a genus of moths in the family Geometridae described by Warren in 1895.

Species
Aenictes basivirida Schaus, 1901
Aenictes muscivaria Warren, 1904
Aenictes polygrapharia Herrich-Schäffer, [1855]
Aenictes sororcula Warren, 1904

References

Ennominae
Geometridae genera